Newmarch is a surname, and may refer to:
 Ann Newmarch (1945–2022), South Australian artist

 Oliver Newmarch (1835–1920), British Indian Army officer
 Rosa Newmarch (1857–1940), English poet and writer on music 
 Sally Newmarch (born 1975), Australian Olympic rower
 William Newmarch (1820–1882), English banker and economist

See also
Newmarch Gallery, an art gallery in Adelaide, South Australia